Pat Bourke may refer to:

Pat Bourke (footballer, born 1894) (1894–1982), Australian footballer for Melbourne
Pat Bourke (footballer, born 1923) (1923–2005), Australian footballer for South Melbourne
Pat Bourke (musician), guitarist with the band Dallas Crane

See also
Paddy Bourke (disambiguation)
Pat Burke (born 1973), Irish basketball player
Patrick Burke (disambiguation)